Antoni Barnaba Jabłonowski (1732–1799) was a Polish noble (szlachcic) and political activist.

Antoni became voivode of Poznań Voivodship in 1760, castellan of Kraków since 1782, starost of Międzyrzecz, Busko-Zdrój, Świecie and Czehryń.

During the Confederation of Bar he was envoy of the leaders of the confederation to the royal court in Austria. He participated in the Great Sejm in 1788–1792 and was member of the Patriotic Party. He was a supporter of the 3 May Constitution. In 1794 he participated in the Kościuszko Uprising.

Knight of the Order of the White Eagle, awarded on 3 August 1761, in Warsaw.

Bibliography
 Helena Wereszycka, Jabłonowski Antoni Barnaba, [w:] Polski Słownik Biograficzny, tom 10, Wrocław – Warszawa 1962–1964, str. 216–218.
 Andrzej Betlej, Sibi, Deo, posteritati. Jabłonowscy a sztuka w XVIII wieku, Kraków 2010, str. 326–327.

1732 births
1799 deaths
Secular senators of the Polish–Lithuanian Commonwealth
Antoni Barnaba Jablonowski
Antoni Barnaba Jablonowski
Kościuszko insurgents
Signers of the Polish Constitution of May 3, 1791
Ambassadors of Poland to Austria
Recipients of the Order of the White Eagle (Poland)